Rock House, Rockhouse, Old Rock House or variations may refer to:


Places

United States
(by state)
 Old Rock House (Harpersville, Alabama), listed on the National Register of Historic Places (NRHP) in Shelby County, Alabama
 Rock House, Arizona, a census-designated place in Gila County
 Rock House (Groom Creek, Arizona), listed on the NRHP in Yavapai County
 Old Rock House (Thomson, Georgia), listed on the NRHP in McDuffie County
 Old Rock House (Alton, Illinois), a station on the Underground Railroad
 Rockhouse, Kentucky, an unincorporated community and coal town in Pike County
 Creelsboro Natural Bridge, in Russell County, Kentucky, commonly referred to as Rock House or the Rockhouse
 Old Rock House (Moscow Mills, Missouri), listed on the NRHP in Lincoln County
 Rock House (King, North Carolina), listed on the NRHP in Stokes County
 Rock House (Roaring Gap, North Carolina), listed on the NRHP in Alleghany County
 Rockhouse, Texas
 Rock House-Custodian's Residence, Moab, Utah, listed on the NRHP in Grand County

United Kingdom
 Rock Houses, at Kinver Edge

Music
 Roy Orbison at the Rock House

See also